New York, often called New York City or NYC, is the most populous city in the United States. New York City is located at the southern tip of New York State. It constitutes the geographical and demographic center of both the Northeast megalopolis and the New York metropolitan area, the largest metropolitan area in the U.S. by both population and urban area. With over 20.1 million people in its metropolitan statistical area and 23.5 million in its combined statistical area as of 2020, New York is one of the world's most populous megacities, and over 58 million people live within  of the city. New York City is a global cultural, financial, entertainment, and media center with a significant influence on commerce, health care and life sciences, research, technology, education, politics, tourism, dining, art, fashion, and sports. Home to the headquarters of the United Nations, New York is an important center for international diplomacy, and is sometimes described as the capital of the world.

Situated on one of the world's largest natural harbors and extending into the Atlantic Ocean, New York City comprises five boroughs, each of which is coextensive with a respective county of the state of New York. The five boroughs, which were created in 1898 when local governments were consolidated into a single municipal entity, are: Brooklyn (in Kings County), Queens (in Queens County), Manhattan (in New York County), The Bronx (in Bronx County), and Staten Island (in Richmond County). 

, the New York metropolitan area is the largest metropolitan economy in the world with a gross metropolitan product of over $2.4 trillion. If the New York metropolitan area were a sovereign state, it would have the eighth-largest economy in the world. New York City is an established safe haven for global investors. New York is home to the highest number of billionaires, individuals of ultra-high net worth (greater than US$30 million), and millionaires of any city in the world.

The city and its metropolitan area constitute the premier gateway for legal immigration to the United States. As many as 800 languages are spoken in New York, making it the most linguistically diverse city in the world. New York City is home to more than 3.2 million residents born outside the U.S., the largest foreign-born population of any city in the world as of 2016. 

New York City traces its origins to a trading post founded on the southern tip of Manhattan Island by Dutch colonists in approximately 1624. The settlement was named New Amsterdam in 1626 and was chartered as a city in 1653. The city came under British control in 1664 and was renamed New York after King Charles II of England granted the lands to his brother, the Duke of York. The city was regained by the Dutch in July 1673 and was renamed New Orange for one year and three months; the city has been continuously named New York since November 1674. New York City was the capital of the United States from 1785 until 1790, and has been the largest U.S. city since 1790. The Statue of Liberty greeted millions of immigrants as they came to the U.S. by ship in the late 19th and early 20th centuries, and is a symbol of the U.S. and its ideals of liberty and peace. In the 21st century, New York City has emerged as a global node of creativity, entrepreneurship, and as a symbol of freedom and cultural diversity. The New York Times has won the most Pulitzer Prizes for journalism and remains the U.S. media's "newspaper of record". In 2019, New York City was voted the greatest city in the world in a survey of over 30,000 people from 48 cities worldwide, citing its cultural diversity.

Many districts and monuments in New York City are major landmarks, including three of the world's ten most visited tourist attractions in 2013. A record 66.6 million tourists visited New York City in 2019. Times Square is the brightly illuminated hub of the Broadway Theater District, one of the world's busiest pedestrian intersections and a major center of the world's entertainment industry. Many of the city's landmarks, skyscrapers, and parks are known around the world, and the city's fast pace led to the phrase New York minute. The Empire State Building is a global standard of reference to describe the height and length of other structures.

Manhattan's real estate market is among the most expensive in the world. Providing continuous 24/7 service and contributing to the nickname The City That Never Sleeps, the New York City Subway is the largest single-operator rapid transit system in the world with  passenger rail stations, and Penn Station in Midtown Manhattan is the busiest transportation hub in the Western Hemisphere. The city has over 120 colleges and universities, including Columbia University, an Ivy League university routinely ranked among the world's top universities, New York University, and the City University of New York system, the largest urban public university system in the nation. Anchored by Wall Street in the Financial District of Lower Manhattan, New York City has been called both the world's leading financial center and the most economically powerful city in the world, and is home to the world's two largest stock exchanges by total market capitalization, the New York Stock Exchange and Nasdaq. 

The Stonewall Inn in Greenwich Village, part of the Stonewall National Monument, is considered the historic epicenter of LGBTQ+ culture and the birthplace of the modern gay rights movement. New York City is the headquarters of the global art market, with numerous art galleries and auction houses collectively hosting half of the world’s art auctions, and the Metropolitan Museum of Art is both the largest art museum and the most visited museum in the United States. Governors Island in New York Harbor is planned to host a US$1billion research and education center addressing the climate crisis.

Etymology

In 1664, New York was named in honor of the Duke of York, who would become King James II of England. James's elder brother, King Charles II, appointed the Duke as proprietor of the former territory of New Netherland, including the city of New Amsterdam, when England seized it from Dutch control.

History

Early history 
In the pre-Columbian era, the area of present-day New York City was inhabited by Algonquian Native Americans, including the Lenape. Their homeland, known as Lenapehoking, included the present-day areas of Staten Island, Manhattan, the Bronx, the western portion of Long Island (including the areas that would later become the boroughs of Brooklyn and Queens), and the Lower Hudson Valley.

The first documented visit into New York Harbor by a European was in 1524 by Italian Giovanni da Verrazzano, an explorer from Florence in the service of the French crown. He claimed the area for France and named it Nouvelle Angoulême (New Angoulême). A Spanish expedition, led by the Portuguese captain Estêvão Gomes sailing for Emperor Charles V, arrived in New York Harbor in January 1525 and charted the mouth of the Hudson River, which he named  ('Saint Anthony's River'). The Padrón Real of 1527, the first scientific map to show the East Coast of North America continuously, was informed by Gomes' expedition and labeled the northeastern United States as Tierra de Esteban Gómez in his honor.

In 1609, the English explorer Henry Hudson rediscovered New York Harbor while searching for the Northwest Passage to the Orient for the Dutch East India Company. He proceeded to sail up what the Dutch would name the North River (now the Hudson River), named first by Hudson as the Mauritius after Maurice, Prince of Orange. Hudson's first mate described the harbor as "a very good Harbour for all windes" and the river as "a mile broad" and "full of fish". He made a ten-day exploration of the area and claimed the region for the Dutch East India Company. In 1614, the area between Cape Cod and Delaware Bay was claimed by the Netherlands and called  ('New Netherland').

The first non–Native American inhabitant of what would eventually become New York City was Juan Rodriguez (transliterated to the Dutch language as Jan Rodrigues), a merchant from Santo Domingo. Born in Santo Domingo of Portuguese and African descent, he arrived in Manhattan during the winter of 1613–14, trapping for pelts and trading with the local population as a representative of the Dutch. Broadway, from 159th Street to 218th Street in Upper Manhattan, is named Juan Rodriguez Way in his honor.

Dutch rule 

A permanent European presence near New York Harbor was established in 1624, making New York the 12th-oldest continuously occupied European-established settlement in the continental United States—with the founding of a Dutch fur trading settlement on Governors Island. In 1625, construction was started on a citadel and Fort Amsterdam, later called Nieuw Amsterdam (New Amsterdam), on present-day Manhattan Island. The colony of New Amsterdam was centered on what would ultimately be known as Lower Manhattan. Its area extended from the southern tip of Manhattan to modern day Wall Street, where a 12-foot wooden stockade was built in 1653 to protect against Native American and British raids. In 1626, the Dutch colonial Director-General Peter Minuit, acting as charged by the Dutch West India Company, purchased the island of Manhattan from the Canarsie, a small Lenape band, for "the value of 60 guilders" (about $900 in 2018). A disproved legend claims that Manhattan was purchased for $24 worth of glass beads.

Following the purchase, New Amsterdam grew slowly. To attract settlers, the Dutch instituted the patroon system in 1628, whereby wealthy Dutchmen (patroons, or patrons) who brought 50 colonists to New Netherland would be awarded swaths of land, along with local political autonomy and rights to participate in the lucrative fur trade. This program had little success.

Since 1621, the Dutch West India Company had operated as a monopoly in New Netherland, on authority granted by the Dutch States General. In 1639–1640, in an effort to bolster economic growth, the Dutch West India Company relinquished its monopoly over the fur trade, leading to growth in the production and trade of food, timber, tobacco, and slaves (particularly with the Dutch West Indies).

In 1647, Peter Stuyvesant began his tenure as the last Director-General of New Netherland. During his tenure, the population of New Netherland grew from 2,000 to 8,000. Stuyvesant has been credited with improving law and order in the colony; however, he also earned a reputation as a despotic leader. He instituted regulations on liquor sales, attempted to assert control over the Dutch Reformed Church, and blocked other religious groups (including Quakers, Jews, and Lutherans) from establishing houses of worship. The Dutch West India Company would eventually attempt to ease tensions between Stuyvesant and residents of New Amsterdam.

English rule 

In 1664, unable to summon any significant resistance, Stuyvesant surrendered New Amsterdam to English troops, led by Colonel Richard Nicolls, without bloodshed. The terms of the surrender permitted Dutch residents to remain in the colony and allowed for religious freedom. In 1667, during negotiations leading to the Treaty of Breda after the Second Anglo-Dutch War, the Dutch decided to keep the nascent plantation colony of what is now Suriname (on the northern South American coast) they had gained from the English; and in return, the English kept New Amsterdam. The fledgling settlement was promptly renamed "New York" after the Duke of York (the future King James II and VII), who would eventually be deposed in the Glorious Revolution. After the founding, the duke gave part of the colony to proprietors George Carteret and John Berkeley. The transfer was confirmed in 1667 by the Treaty of Breda, which concluded the Second Anglo-Dutch War.

On August 24, 1673, during the Third Anglo-Dutch War, Dutch captain Anthony Colve seized the colony of New York from the English at the behest of Cornelis Evertsen the Youngest and rechristened it "New Orange" after William III, the Prince of Orange. The Dutch would soon return the island to England under the Treaty of Westminster of November 1674.

Several intertribal wars among the Native Americans and some epidemics brought on by contact with the Europeans caused sizeable population losses for the Lenape between the years 1660 and 1670. By 1700, the Lenape population had diminished to 200. New York experienced several yellow fever epidemics in the 18th century, losing ten percent of its population to the disease in 1702 alone.

Province of New York and slavery 

In the early 18th century, New York grew in importance as a trading port while as a part of the colony of New York. It also became a center of slavery, with 42% of households enslaving Africans by 1730, the highest percentage outside Charleston, South Carolina. Most cases were that of domestic slavery, as a New York household then commonly enslaved few or several people. Others were hired out to work at labor. Slavery became integrally tied to New York's economy through the labor of slaves throughout the port, and the banking and shipping industries trading with the American South. During construction in Foley Square in the 1990s, the African Burying Ground was discovered; the cemetery included 10,000 to 20,000 of graves of colonial-era Africans, some enslaved and some free.

The 1735 trial and acquittal in Manhattan of John Peter Zenger, who had been accused of seditious libel after criticizing colonial governor William Cosby, helped to establish the freedom of the press in North America. In 1754, Columbia University was founded under charter by King George II as King's College in Lower Manhattan.

American Revolution 

The Stamp Act Congress met in New York in October 1765, as the Sons of Liberty organization emerged in the city and skirmished over the next ten years with British troops stationed there. The Battle of Long Island, the largest battle of the American Revolutionary War, was fought in August 1776 within the modern-day borough of Brooklyn. After the battle, in which the Americans were defeated, the British made the city their military and political base of operations in North America. The city was a haven for Loyalist refugees and escaped slaves who joined the British lines for freedom newly promised by the Crown for all fighters. As many as 10,000 escaped slaves crowded into the city during the British occupation. When the British forces evacuated at the close of the war in 1783, they transported 3,000 freedmen for resettlement in Nova Scotia. They resettled other freedmen in England and the Caribbean.

The only attempt at a peaceful solution to the war took place at the Conference House on Staten Island between American delegates, including Benjamin Franklin, and British general Lord Howe on September 11, 1776. Shortly after the British occupation began, the Great Fire of New York occurred, a large conflagration on the West Side of Lower Manhattan, which destroyed about a quarter of the buildings in the city, including Trinity Church.

In 1785, the assembly of the Congress of the Confederation made New York City the national capital shortly after the war. New York was the last capital of the U.S. under the Articles of Confederation and the first capital under the Constitution of the United States. New York City as the U.S. capital hosted several events of national scope in 1789—the first President of the United States, George Washington, was inaugurated; the first United States Congress and the Supreme Court of the United States each assembled for the first time; and the United States Bill of Rights was drafted, all at Federal Hall on Wall Street. In 1790, New York surpassed Philadelphia as the nation's largest city. At the end of that year, pursuant to the Residence Act, the national capital was moved to Philadelphia.

19th century

Over the course of the nineteenth century, New York City's population grew from 60,000 to 3.43 million. Under New York State's abolition act of 1799, children of slave mothers were to be eventually liberated but to be held in indentured servitude until their mid-to-late twenties. Together with slaves freed by their masters after the Revolutionary War and escaped slaves, a significant free-Black population gradually developed in Manhattan. Under such influential United States founders as Alexander Hamilton and John Jay, the New York Manumission Society worked for abolition and established the African Free School to educate Black children. It was not until 1827 that slavery was completely abolished in the state, and free Blacks struggled afterward with discrimination. New York interracial abolitionist activism continued; among its leaders were graduates of the African Free School. New York city's population jumped from 123,706 in 1820 to 312,710 by 1840, 16,000 of whom were Black.

In the 19th century, the city was transformed by both commercial and residential development relating to its status as a national and international trading center, as well as by European immigration, respectively. The city adopted the Commissioners' Plan of 1811, which expanded the city street grid to encompass almost all of Manhattan. The 1825 completion of the Erie Canal through central New York connected the Atlantic port to the agricultural markets and commodities of the North American interior via the Hudson River and the Great Lakes. Local politics became dominated by Tammany Hall, a political machine supported by Irish and German immigrants.

Several prominent American literary figures lived in New York during the 1830s and 1840s, including William Cullen Bryant, Washington Irving, Herman Melville, Rufus Wilmot Griswold, John Keese, Nathaniel Parker Willis, and Edgar Allan Poe. Public-minded members of the contemporaneous business elite lobbied for the establishment of Central Park, which in 1857 became the first landscaped park in an American city.

The Great Irish Famine brought a large influx of Irish immigrants; more than 200,000 were living in New York by 1860, upwards of a quarter of the city's population. There was also extensive immigration from the German provinces, where revolutions had disrupted societies, and Germans comprised another 25% of New York's population by 1860.

Democratic Party candidates were consistently elected to local office, increasing the city's ties to the South and its dominant party. In 1861, Mayor Fernando Wood called upon the aldermen to declare independence from Albany and the United States after the South seceded, but his proposal was not acted on. Anger at new military conscription laws during the American Civil War (1861–1865), which spared wealthier men who could afford to pay a $300 commutation fee to hire a substitute, led to the Draft Riots of 1863, whose most visible participants were ethnic Irish working class.

The draft riots deteriorated into attacks on New York's elite, followed by attacks on Black New Yorkers and their property after fierce competition for a decade between Irish immigrants and Black people for work. Rioters burned the Colored Orphan Asylum to the ground, with more than 200 children escaping harm due to efforts of the New York Police Department, which was mainly made up of Irish immigrants. At least 120 people were killed. Eleven Black men were lynched over five days, and the riots forced hundreds of Blacks to flee the city for Williamsburg, Brooklyn, and New Jersey. The Black population in Manhattan fell below 10,000 by 1865, which it had last been in 1820. The White working class had established dominance. Violence by longshoremen against Black men was especially fierce in the docks area. It was one of the worst incidents of civil unrest in American history.

In 1898, the City of New York was formed with the consolidation of Brooklyn (until then a separate city), the County of New York (which then included parts of the Bronx), the County of Richmond, and the western portion of the County of Queens. The opening of the subway in 1904, first built as separate private systems, helped bind the new city together. Throughout the first half of the 20th century, the city became a world center for industry, commerce, and communication.

20th century

In 1904, the steamship General Slocum caught fire in the East River, killing 1,021 people on board. In 1911, the Triangle Shirtwaist Factory fire, the city's worst industrial disaster, took the lives of 146 garment workers and spurred the growth of the International Ladies' Garment Workers' Union and major improvements in factory safety standards.

New York's non-White population was 36,620 in 1890. New York City was a prime destination in the early twentieth century for African Americans during the Great Migration from the American South, and by 1916, New York City had become home to the largest urban African diaspora in North America. The Harlem Renaissance of literary and cultural life flourished during the era of Prohibition. The larger economic boom generated construction of skyscrapers competing in height and creating an identifiable skyline.

New York became the most populous urbanized area in the world in the early 1920s, overtaking London. The metropolitan area surpassed the 10 million mark in the early 1930s, becoming the first megacity in human history. The Great Depression saw the election of reformer Fiorello La Guardia as mayor and the fall of Tammany Hall after eighty years of political dominance.

Returning World War II veterans created a post-war economic boom and the development of large housing tracts in eastern Queens and Nassau County as well as similar suburban areas in New Jersey. New York emerged from the war unscathed as the leading city of the world, with Wall Street leading America's place as the world's dominant economic power. The United Nations headquarters was completed in 1952, solidifying New York's global geopolitical influence, and the rise of abstract expressionism in the city precipitated New York's displacement of Paris as the center of the art world.

The Stonewall riots were a series of spontaneous, violent protests by members of the gay community against a police raid that took place in the early morning hours of June 28, 1969, at the Stonewall Inn in the Greenwich Village neighborhood of Lower Manhattan. They are widely considered to constitute the single most important event leading to the gay liberation movement and the modern fight for LGBT rights. Wayne R. Dynes, author of the Encyclopedia of Homosexuality, wrote that drag queens were the only "transgender folks around" during the June 1969 Stonewall riots. The transgender community in New York City played a significant role in fighting for LGBT equality during the period of the Stonewall riots and thereafter.

In the 1970s, job losses due to industrial restructuring caused New York City to suffer from economic problems and rising crime rates. While a resurgence in the financial industry greatly improved the city's economic health in the 1980s, New York's crime rate continued to increase through that decade and into the beginning of the 1990s. By the mid 1990s, crime rates started to drop dramatically due to revised police strategies, improving economic opportunities, gentrification, and new residents, both American transplants and new immigrants from Asia and Latin America. Important new sectors, such as Silicon Alley, emerged in the city's economy.

21st century 

New York's population reached all-time highs in the 2000 census and then again in the 2010 census.

New York City suffered the bulk of the economic damage and largest loss of human life in the aftermath of the September 11, 2001, attacks. Two of the four airliners hijacked that day were flown into the twin towers of the World Trade Center, destroying the towers and killing 2,192 civilians, 343 firefighters, and 71 law enforcement officers. The North Tower became the tallest building ever to be destroyed anywhere then or subsequently.

The area was rebuilt with a new One World Trade Center, a 9/11 memorial and museum, and other new buildings and infrastructure. The World Trade Center PATH station, which had opened on July 19, 1909, as the Hudson Terminal, was also destroyed in the attacks. A temporary station was built and opened on November 23, 2003. An  permanent rail station designed by Santiago Calatrava, the World Trade Center Transportation Hub, the city's third-largest hub, was completed in 2016. The new One World Trade Center is the tallest skyscraper in the Western Hemisphere and the seventh-tallest building in the world by pinnacle height, with its spire reaching a symbolic  in reference to the year of U.S. independence.

The Occupy Wall Street protests in Zuccotti Park in the Financial District of Lower Manhattan began on September 17, 2011, receiving global attention and popularizing the Occupy movement against social and economic inequality worldwide.

New York City was heavily affected by Hurricane Sandy in late October 2012. Sandy's impacts included the flooding of the New York City Subway system, of many suburban communities, and of all road tunnels entering Manhattan except the Lincoln Tunnel. The New York Stock Exchange closed for two consecutive days. Numerous homes and businesses were destroyed by fire, including over 100 homes in Breezy Point, Queens. Large parts of the city and surrounding areas lost electricity for several days. Several thousand people in Midtown Manhattan were evacuated for six days due to a crane collapse at Extell's One57. Bellevue Hospital Center and a few other large hospitals were closed and evacuated. Flooding at 140 West Street and another exchange disrupted voice and data communication in Lower Manhattan. At least 43 people lost their lives in New York City as a result of Sandy, and the economic losses in New York City were estimated to be roughly $19 billion. The disaster spawned long-term efforts towards infrastructural projects to counter climate change and rising seas.

In March 2020, the first case of COVID-19 in the city was confirmed in Manhattan. The city rapidly replaced Wuhan, China to become the global epicenter of the pandemic during the early phase, before the infection became widespread across the world and the rest of the nation. As of March 2021, New York City had recorded over 30,000 deaths from COVID-19-related complications. In 2022, the LGBT community in New York City became the epicenter of the monkeypox outbreak in the Western Hemisphere, prompting New York Governor Kathy Hochul and New York City Mayor Eric Adams declared corresponding public health emergencies in the state and city, respectively, in July 2022.

Geography 

The erosive forward movement of the ice (and its subsequent retreat) contributed to the separation of what is now Long Island and Staten Island. That action also left bedrock at a relatively shallow depth, providing a solid foundation for most of Manhattan's skyscrapers.

New York City is situated in the northeastern United States, in southeastern New York State, approximately halfway between Washington, D.C. and Boston. The location at the mouth of the Hudson River, which feeds into a naturally sheltered harbor and then into the Atlantic Ocean, has helped the city grow in significance as a trading port. Most of New York City is built on the three islands of Long Island, Manhattan, and Staten Island.

The Hudson River flows through the Hudson Valley into New York Bay. Between New York City and Troy, New York, the river is an estuary. The Hudson River separates the city from the U.S. state of New Jersey. The East River—a tidal strait—flows from Long Island Sound and separates the Bronx and Manhattan from Long Island. The Harlem River, another tidal strait between the East and Hudson rivers, separates most of Manhattan from the Bronx. The Bronx River, which flows through the Bronx and Westchester County, is the only entirely freshwater river in the city.

The city's land has been altered substantially by human intervention, with considerable land reclamation along the waterfronts since Dutch colonial times; reclamation is most prominent in Lower Manhattan, with developments such as Battery Park City in the 1970s and 1980s. Some of the natural relief in topography has been evened out, especially in Manhattan.

The summit of the ridge is mostly covered in woodlands as part of the Staten Island Greenbelt.

Boroughs 

 is sometimes referred to collectively as the Five Boroughs. Each borough is coextensive with a respective county of New York State, making New York City one of the U.S. municipalities in multiple counties. There are hundreds of distinct neighborhoods throughout the boroughs, many with a definable history and character.

If the boroughs were each independent cities, four of the boroughs (Brooklyn, Queens, Manhattan, and the Bronx) would be among the ten most populous cities in the United States (Staten Island would be ranked 37th as of 2020); these same boroughs are coterminous with the four most densely populated counties in the United States: New York (Manhattan), Kings (Brooklyn), Bronx, and Queens.

Manhattan 

Manhattan (New York County) is the geographically smallest and most densely populated borough. It is home to Central Park and most of the city's skyscrapers, and is sometimes locally known as The City. Manhattan's population density of 72,033 people per square mile (27,812/km) in 2015 makes it the highest of any county in the United States and higher than the density of any individual American city.

Manhattan is the cultural, administrative, and financial center of New York City and contains the headquarters of many major multinational corporations, the United Nations headquarters, Wall Street, and a number of important universities. The borough of Manhattan is often described as the financial and cultural center of the world.

Most of the borough is situated on Manhattan Island, at the mouth of the Hudson River and the East River, and its southern tip, at the confluence of the two rivers, represents the birthplace of New York City itself. Several small islands also compose part of the borough of Manhattan, including Randalls and Wards Islands, and Roosevelt Island in the East River, and Governors Island and Liberty Island to the south in New York Harbor.

Manhattan Island is loosely divided into the Lower, Midtown, and Uptown regions. Uptown Manhattan is divided by Central Park into the Upper East Side and the Upper West Side, and above the park is Harlem, bordering the Bronx (Bronx County).

Harlem was predominantly occupied by Jewish and Italian Americans in the 19th century until the Great Migration. It was the center of the Harlem Renaissance.

The borough of Manhattan also includes a small neighborhood on the mainland, called Marble Hill, which is contiguous with the Bronx. New York City's remaining four boroughs are collectively referred to as the Outer Boroughs.

Brooklyn 
Brooklyn (Kings County), on the western tip of Long Island, is the city's most populous borough. Brooklyn is known for its cultural, social, and ethnic diversity, an independent art scene, distinct neighborhoods, and a distinctive architectural heritage. Downtown Brooklyn is the largest central core neighborhood in the Outer Boroughs. The borough has a long beachfront shoreline including Coney Island, established in the 1870s as one of the earliest amusement grounds in the U.S. Marine Park and Prospect Park are the two largest parks in Brooklyn. Since 2010, Brooklyn has evolved into a thriving hub of entrepreneurship and high technology startup firms, and of postmodern art and design.

Queens 

Queens (Queens County), on Long Island north and east of Brooklyn, is geographically the largest borough, the most ethnically diverse county in the United States, and the most ethnically diverse urban area in the world. Historically a collection of small towns and villages founded by the Dutch, the borough has since developed both commercial and residential prominence. Downtown Flushing has become one of the busiest central core neighborhoods in the outer boroughs. Queens is the site of the Citi Field baseball stadium, home of the New York Mets, and hosts the annual U.S. Open tennis tournament at Flushing Meadows–Corona Park. Additionally, two of the three busiest airports serving the New York metropolitan area, John F. Kennedy International Airport and LaGuardia Airport, are in Queens. The third is Newark Liberty International Airport in Newark, New Jersey.

The Bronx 
The Bronx (Bronx County) is both New York City's northernmost borough, and the only one that is mostly on the mainland. It is the location of Yankee Stadium, the baseball park of the New York Yankees, and home to the largest cooperatively-owned housing complex in the United States, Co-op City. It is also home to the Bronx Zoo, the world's largest metropolitan zoo, which spans  and houses more than 6,000 animals. The Bronx is also the birthplace of hip hop music and its associated culture.

Staten Island 

Staten Island (Richmond County) is the most suburban in character of the five boroughs. Staten Island is connected to Brooklyn by the Verrazzano-Narrows Bridge, and to Manhattan by way of the free Staten Island Ferry, a daily commuter ferry that provides unobstructed views of the Statue of Liberty, Ellis Island, and Lower Manhattan. Designated in 1984 to protect the island's natural lands, the Greenbelt comprises seven city parks.

Architecture 

New York has architecturally noteworthy buildings in a wide range of styles and from distinct time periods, from the Dutch Colonial Pieter Claesen Wyckoff House in Brooklyn, the oldest section of which dates to 1656, to the modern One World Trade Center, the skyscraper at Ground Zero in Lower Manhattan and the most expensive office tower in the world by construction cost.

Manhattan's skyline, with its many skyscrapers, is universally recognized, and the city has been home to several of the tallest buildings in the world. , New York City had 6,455 high-rise buildings, the third most in the world after Hong Kong and Seoul. These include the Woolworth Building, an early example of Gothic Revival architecture in skyscraper design, built with massively scaled Gothic detailing; completed in 1913, for 17 years it was the world's tallest building.

The 1916 Zoning Resolution required setbacks in new buildings and restricted towers to a percentage of the lot size, to allow sunlight to reach the streets below. The Art Deco style of the Chrysler Building (1930) and Empire State Building (1931), with their tapered tops and steel spires, reflected the zoning requirements. The buildings have distinctive ornamentation, such as the eagles at the corners of the 61st floor on the Chrysler Building, and are considered some of the finest examples of the Art Deco style. A highly influential example of the International Style in the United States is the Seagram Building (1957), distinctive for its façade using visible bronze-toned I-beams to evoke the building's structure. The Condé Nast Building (2000) is a prominent example of green design in American skyscrapers and has received an award from the American Institute of Architects and AIA New York State for its design.

The character of New York's large residential districts is often defined by the elegant brownstone rowhouses and townhouses and shabby tenements that were built during a period of rapid expansion from 1870 to 1930. In contrast, New York City also has neighborhoods that are less densely populated and feature free-standing dwellings. In neighborhoods such as Riverdale (in the Bronx), Ditmas Park (in Brooklyn), and Douglaston (in Queens), large single-family homes are common in various architectural styles such as Tudor Revival and Victorian.

Stone and brick became the city's building materials of choice after the construction of wood-frame houses was limited in the aftermath of the Great Fire of 1835. A distinctive feature of many of the city's buildings is the roof-mounted wooden water tower. In the 1800s, the city required their installation on buildings higher than six stories to prevent the need for excessively high water pressures at lower elevations, which could break municipal water pipes. Garden apartments became popular during the 1920s in outlying areas, such as Jackson Heights.

According to the United States Geological Survey, an updated analysis of seismic hazard in July 2014 revealed a "slightly lower hazard for tall buildings" in New York City than previously assessed. Scientists estimated this lessened risk based upon a lower likelihood than previously thought of slow shaking near the city, which would be more likely to cause damage to taller structures from an earthquake in the vicinity of the city. Manhattan contained over 500 million square feet of office space as of 2022; the COVID-19 pandemic and hybrid work model have prompted consideration of commercial-to-residential conversion within Midtown Manhattan.

Climate 

Under the Köppen climate classification, using the  isotherm, New York City features a humid subtropical climate (Cfa), and is thus the northernmost major city on the North American continent with this categorization. The suburbs to the immediate north and west lie in the transitional zone between humid subtropical and humid continental climates (Dfa). By the Trewartha classification, the city is defined as having an oceanic climate (Do). Annually, the city averages 234 days with at least some sunshine. The city lies in the USDA 7b plant hardiness zone.

Winters are chilly and damp, and prevailing wind patterns that blow sea breezes offshore temper the moderating effects of the Atlantic Ocean; yet the Atlantic and the partial shielding from colder air by the Appalachian Mountains keep the city warmer in the winter than inland North American cities at similar or lesser latitudes such as Pittsburgh, Cincinnati, and Indianapolis. Temperatures usually drop to  several times per winter, yet can also reach  for several days even in the coldest winter month. Spring and autumn are unpredictable and can range from cool to warm, although they are usually mild with low humidity.

Nighttime temperatures are often enhanced due to the urban heat island effect. Daytime temperatures exceed  on average of 17 days each summer and in some years exceed , although this is a rare achievement, last occurring on July 18, 2012.

The city receives  of precipitation annually, which is relatively evenly spread throughout the year. Average winter snowfall between 1991 and 2020 has been ; this varies considerably between years. Hurricanes and tropical storms are rare in the New York area. Hurricane Sandy brought a destructive storm surge to New York City on the evening of October 29, 2012, flooding numerous streets, tunnels, and subway lines in Lower Manhattan and other areas of the city and cutting off electricity in many parts of the city and its suburbs. The storm and its profound impacts have prompted the discussion of constructing seawalls and other coastal barriers around the shorelines of the city and the metropolitan area to minimize the risk of destructive consequences from another such event in the future.

The earliest seasonal trace of snowfall occurred on October 10, in both 1979 and 1925. The latest seasonal trace of snowfall occurred on May 9, in both 2020 and 1977.

Parks 

The city of New York has a complex park system, with various lands operated by the National Park Service, the New York State Office of Parks, Recreation and Historic Preservation, and the New York City Department of Parks and Recreation. In its 2018 ParkScore ranking, the Trust for Public Land reported that the park system in New York City was the ninth-best park system among the fifty most populous U.S. cities. ParkScore ranks urban park systems by a formula that analyzes median park size, park acres as percent of city area, the percent of city residents within a half-mile of a park, spending of park services per resident, and the number of playgrounds per 10,000 residents. In 2021, the New York City Council banned the use of synthetic pesticides by city agencies and instead required organic lawn management. The effort was started by teacher Paula Rogovin's kindergarten class at P.S. 290.

National parks 

Also in Queens, the park includes a significant portion of the western Rockaway Peninsula, most notably Jacob Riis Park and Fort Tilden. In Staten Island, it includes Fort Wadsworth, with historic pre-Civil War era Battery Weed and Fort Tompkins, and Great Kills Park, with beaches, trails, and a marina.

The Statue of Liberty National Monument and Ellis Island Immigration Museum are managed by the National Park Service and are in both New York and New Jersey. They are joined in the harbor by Governors Island National Monument. Historic sites under federal management on Manhattan Island include Stonewall National Monument; Castle Clinton National Monument; Federal Hall National Memorial; Theodore Roosevelt Birthplace National Historic Site; General Grant National Memorial (Grant's Tomb); African Burial Ground National Monument; and Hamilton Grange National Memorial. Hundreds of properties are listed on the National Register of Historic Places or as a National Historic Landmark.

State parks 

There are seven state parks within the confines of New York City. Some of them include:
The Clay Pit Ponds State Park Preserve is a natural area that includes extensive riding trails.
Riverbank State Park is a  facility that rises  over the Hudson River.
 Marsha P. Johnson State Park is a state park in Brooklyn and Manhattan that borders the East River that was renamed in honor of MarshaP. Johnson.

City parks 

 Central Park, an  park in middle-upper Manhattan, is the most visited urban park in the United States and one of the most filmed locations in the world, with 40 million visitors in 2013. The park has a wide range of attractions; there are several lakes and ponds, two ice-skating rinks, the Central Park Zoo, the Central Park Conservatory Garden, and the  Jackie Onassis Reservoir. Indoor attractions include Belvedere Castle with its nature center, the Swedish Cottage Marionette Theater, and the historic Carousel. On October 23, 2012, hedge fund manager John A. Paulson announced a $100 million gift to the Central Park Conservancy, the largest ever monetary donation to New York City's park system.
 Washington Square Park is a prominent landmark in the Greenwich Village neighborhood of Lower Manhattan. The Washington Square Arch at the northern gateway to the park is an iconic symbol of both New York University and Greenwich Village.
 Prospect Park in Brooklyn has a  meadow, a lake, and extensive woodlands. Within the park is the historic Battle Pass, prominent in the Battle of Long Island.
 Flushing Meadows–Corona Park in Queens, with its  making it the city's fourth largest park, was the setting for the 1939 World's Fair and the 1964 World's Fair and is host to the USTA Billie Jean King National Tennis Center and the annual U.S. Open Tennis Championships tournament.
 Over a fifth of the Bronx's area, is dedicated to open space and parks, including Pelham Bay Park, Van Cortlandt Park, the Bronx Zoo, and the New York Botanical Gardens.
 In Staten Island, the Conference House Park contains the historic Conference House, site of the only attempt of a peaceful resolution to the American Revolution which was conducted in September 1775, attended by Benjamin Franklin representing the Americans and Lord Howe representing the British Crown. The historic Burial Ridge, the largest Native American burial ground within New York City, is within the park.

Military installations 
Brooklyn is home to Fort Hamilton, the U.S. military's only active duty installation within New York City, aside from Coast Guard operations. The facility was established in 1825 on the site of a small battery used during the American Revolution, and it is one of America's longest serving military forts. Today, Fort Hamilton serves as the headquarters of the North Atlantic Division of the United States Army Corps of Engineers and for the New York City Recruiting Battalion. It also houses the 1179th Transportation Brigade, the 722nd Aeromedical Staging Squadron, and a military entrance processing station. Other formerly active military reservations still used for National Guard and military training or reserve operations in the city include Fort Wadsworth in Staten Island and Fort Totten in Queens.

Demographics 

New York City is the most populous city in the United States, with 8,804,190 residents incorporating more immigration into the city than outmigration since the 2010 United States census. More than twice as many people live in New York City as compared to Los Angeles, the second-most populous U.S. city; and New York has more than three times the population of Chicago, the third-most populous U.S. city. New York City gained more residents between 2010 and 2020 (629,000) than any other U.S. city, and a greater amount than the total sum of the gains over the same decade of the next four largest U.S. cities, Los Angeles, Chicago, Houston, and Phoenix, Arizona combined. New York City's population is about 44% of New York State's population, and about 39% of the population of the New York metropolitan area. The majority of New York City residents in 2020 (5,141,538, or 58.4%) were living on Long Island, in Brooklyn, or in Queens. The New York City metropolitan statistical area, has the largest foreign-born population of any metropolitan region in the world. The New York region continues to be by far the leading metropolitan gateway for legal immigrants admitted into the United States, substantially exceeding the combined totals of Los Angeles and Miami.

Population density 

Geographically co-extensive with New York County, the borough of Manhattan's 2017 population density of  makes it the highest of any county in the United States and higher than the density of any individual American city. The next three densest counties in the United States, placing second through fourth, are also New York boroughs: Brooklyn, the Bronx, and Queens respectively.

Race and ethnicity 

The city's population in 2020 was 30.9% White (non-Hispanic), 28.7% Hispanic or Latino, 20.2% Black or African American (non-Hispanic), 15.6% Asian, and 0.2% Native American (non-Hispanic). A total of 3.4% of the non-Hispanic population identified with more than one race. Throughout its history, New York has been a major port of entry for immigrants into the United States. More than 12 million European immigrants were received at Ellis Island between 1892 and 1924. The term "melting pot" was first coined to describe densely populated immigrant neighborhoods on the Lower East Side. By 1900, Germans constituted the largest immigrant group, followed by the Irish, Jews, and Italians. In 1940, Whites represented 92% of the city's population.

Approximately 37% of the city's population is foreign born, and more than half of all children are born to mothers who are immigrants as of 2013. In New York, no single country or region of origin dominates. The ten largest sources of foreign-born individuals in the city  were the Dominican Republic, China, Mexico, Guyana, Jamaica, Ecuador, Haiti, India, Russia, and Trinidad and Tobago, while the Bangladeshi-born immigrant population has become one of the fastest growing in the city, counting over 74,000 by 2011.

Asian Americans in New York City, according to the 2010 census, number more than one million, greater than the combined totals of San Francisco and Los Angeles. New York contains the highest total Asian population of any U.S. city proper. The New York City borough of Queens is home to the state's largest Asian American population and the largest Andean (Colombian, Ecuadorian, Peruvian, and Bolivian) populations in the United States, and is also the most ethnically  and linguistically diverse urban area in the world.

The Chinese population constitutes the fastest-growing nationality in New York State. Multiple satellites of the original Manhattan's Chinatown—home to the highest concentration of Chinese people in the Western Hemisphere, as well as in Brooklyn, and around Flushing, Queens, are thriving as traditionally urban enclaves—while also expanding rapidly eastward into suburban Nassau County on Long Island, as the New York metropolitan region and New York State have become the top destinations for new Chinese immigrants, respectively, and large-scale Chinese immigration continues into New York City and surrounding areas, with the largest metropolitan Chinese diaspora outside Asia, including an estimated 812,410 individuals in 2015.

In 2012, 6.3% of New York City was of Chinese ethnicity, with nearly three-fourths living in either Queens or Brooklyn, geographically on Long Island. A community numbering 20,000 Korean-Chinese (Chaoxianzu or Joseonjok) is centered in Flushing, Queens, while New York City is also home to the largest Tibetan population outside China, India, and Nepal, also centered in Queens. Koreans made up 1.2% of the city's population, and Japanese 0.3%. Filipinos were the largest Southeast Asian ethnic group at 0.8%, followed by Vietnamese, who made up 0.2% of New York City's population in 2010. Indians are the largest South Asian group, comprising 2.4% of the city's population, with Bangladeshis and Pakistanis at 0.7% and 0.5%, respectively. Queens is the preferred borough of settlement for Asian Indians, Koreans, Filipinos and Malaysians, and other Southeast Asians; while Brooklyn is receiving large numbers of both West Indian and Asian Indian immigrants.

New York City has the largest European and non-Hispanic white population of any American city. At 2.7 million in 2012, New York's non-Hispanic White population is larger than the non-Hispanic White populations of Los Angeles (1.1 million), Chicago (865,000), and Houston (550,000) combined. The non-Hispanic White population was 6.6 million in 1940. The non-Hispanic White population has begun to increase since 2010.

The European diaspora residing in the city is very diverse. According to 2012 census estimates, there were roughly 560,000 Italian Americans, 385,000 Irish Americans, 253,000 German Americans, 223,000 Russian Americans, 201,000 Polish Americans, and 137,000 English Americans. Additionally, Greek and French Americans numbered 65,000 each, with those of Hungarian descent estimated at 60,000 people. Ukrainian and Scottish Americans numbered 55,000 and 35,000, respectively. People identifying ancestry from Spain numbered 30,838 total in 2010.

People of Norwegian and Swedish descent both stood at about 20,000 each, while people of Czech, Lithuanian, Portuguese, Scotch-Irish, and Welsh descent all numbered between 12,000 and 14,000. Arab Americans number over 160,000 in New York City, with the highest concentration in Brooklyn. Central Asians, primarily Uzbek Americans, are a rapidly growing segment of the city's non-Hispanic White population, enumerating over 30,000, and including more than half of all Central Asian immigrants to the United States, most settling in Queens or Brooklyn. Albanian Americans are most highly concentrated in the Bronx, while Astoria, Queens is the epicenter of American Greek culture as well as the Cypriot community.

New York is also home to the highest Jewish population of any city in the world, numbering 1.6 million in 2022, more than Tel Aviv and Jerusalem combined. In the borough of Brooklyn, an estimated 1 in 4 residents is Jewish. The city's Jewish communities are derived from many diverse sects, predominantly from around the Middle East and Eastern Europe, and including a rapidly growing Orthodox Jewish population, also the largest outside Israel.

The metropolitan area is also home to 20% of the nation's Indian Americans and at least 20 Little India enclaves, and 15% of all Korean Americans and four Koreatowns; the largest Asian Indian population in the Western Hemisphere; the largest Russian American, Italian American, and African American populations; the largest Dominican American, Puerto Rican American, and South American and second-largest overall Hispanic population in the United States, numbering 4.8 million; and includes multiple established Chinatowns within New York City alone.

Ecuador, Colombia, Guyana, Peru, Brazil, and Venezuela are the top source countries from South America for immigrants to the New York City region; the Dominican Republic, Jamaica, Haiti, and Trinidad and Tobago in the Caribbean; Nigeria, Egypt, Ghana, Tanzania, Kenya, and South Africa from Africa; and El Salvador, Honduras, and Guatemala in Central America. Amidst a resurgence of Puerto Rican migration to New York City, this population had increased to approximately 1.3 million in the metropolitan area . In 2022, New York City began receiving thousands of Latino immigrants bused from the state of Texas, mostly originating from Venezuela, Ecuador, Columbia, and Honduras.

Since 2010, Little Australia has emerged and is growing rapidly, representing the Australasian presence in Nolita, Manhattan. In 2011, there were an estimated 20,000 Australian residents of New York City, nearly quadruple the 5,537 in 2005. Qantas Airways of Australia and Air New Zealand have been planning for long-haul flights from New York to Sydney and Auckland, which would both rank among the longest non-stop flights in the world. A Little Sri Lanka has developed in the Tompkinsville neighborhood of Staten Island. Le Petit Sénégal, or Little Senegal, is based in Harlem. Richmond Hill, Queens is often thought of as "Little Guyana" for its large Guyanese community, as well as Punjab Avenue (ਪੰਜਾਬ ਐਵੇਨਿਊ), or Little Punjab, for its high concentration of Punjabi people. Little Poland is expanding rapidly in Greenpoint, Brooklyn.

Sexual orientation and gender identity 

New York City has been described as the gay capital of the world, and is home to one of the world’s largest LGBTQ populations and the most prominent. The New York metropolitan area is home to about 570,000 self-identifying gay and bisexual people, the largest in the United States. Same-sex sexual activity between consenting adults has been legal in New York since the New York v. Onofre case in 1980 which invalidated the state's sodomy law. Same-sex marriages in New York were legalized on June 24, 2011, and were authorized to take place on July 23, 2011. Brian Silverman, the author of Frommer's New York City from $90 a Day, wrote the city has "one of the world's largest, loudest, and most powerful LGBT communities", and "Gay and lesbian culture is as much a part of New York's basic identity as yellow cabs, high-rise buildings, and Broadway theatre". LGBT travel guide Queer in the World states, "The fabulosity of Gay New York is unrivaled on Earth, and queer culture seeps into every corner of its five boroughs". LGBT advocate and entertainer Madonna stated metaphorically, "Anyways, not only is New York City the best place in the world because of the queer people here. Let me tell you something, if you can make it here, then you must be queer."

The annual New York City Pride March (or gay pride parade) proceeds southward down Fifth Avenue and ends at Greenwich Village in Lower Manhattan; the parade is the largest pride parade in the world, attracting tens of thousands of participants and millions of sidewalk spectators each June. The annual Queens Pride Parade is held in Jackson Heights and is accompanied by the ensuing Multicultural Parade.

Stonewall 50 – WorldPride NYC 2019 was the largest international Pride celebration in history, produced by Heritage of Pride and enhanced through a partnership with the I ❤ NY program's LGBT division, commemorating the 50th anniversary of the Stonewall uprising, with 150,000 participants and five million spectators attending in Manhattan alone. New York City is also home to the largest transgender population in the world, estimated at more than 50,000 in 2018, concentrated in Manhattan and Queens; however, until the June 1969 Stonewall riots, this community had felt marginalized and neglected by the gay community. Brooklyn Liberation March, the largest transgender-rights demonstration in LGBTQ history, took place on June 14, 2020, stretching from Grand Army Plaza to Fort Greene, Brooklyn, focused on supporting Black transgender lives, drawing an estimated 15,000 to 20,000 participants.

Religion

Christianity 

Largely as a result of Western European missionary work and colonialism, Christianity is the largest religion (59% adherent) in New York City, which is home to the highest number of churches of any city in the world. Roman Catholicism is the largest Christian denomination (33%), followed by Protestantism (23%), and other Christian denominations (3%). The Roman Catholic population are primarily served by the Roman Catholic Archdiocese of New York and Diocese of Brooklyn. Eastern Catholics are divided into numerous jurisdictions throughout the city. Evangelical Protestantism is the largest branch of Protestantism in the city (9%), followed by Mainline Protestantism (8%), while the converse is usually true for other cities and metropolitan areas. In Evangelicalism, Baptists are the largest group; in Mainline Protestantism, Reformed Protestants compose the largest subset. The majority of historically African American churches are affiliated with the National Baptist Convention (USA) and Progressive National Baptist Convention. The Church of God in Christ is one of the largest predominantly Black Pentecostal denominations in the area. Approximately 1% of the population is Mormon. The Greek Orthodox Archdiocese of America and other Orthodox Christians (mainstream and independent) were the largest Eastern Christian groups. The American Orthodox Catholic Church (initially led by Aftimios Ofiesh) was founded in New York City in 1927.

Judaism 

Judaism, the second-largest religion practiced in New York City, with approximately 1.6 million adherents as of 2022, represents the largest Jewish community of any city in the world, greater than the combined totals of Tel Aviv and Jerusalem. Nearly half of the city’s Jews live in Brooklyn, which is one-quarter Jewish. The ethno-religious population makes up 18.4% of the city and its religious demographic makes up 8%. The first recorded Jewish settler was Jacob Barsimson, who arrived in August 1654 on a passport from the Dutch West India Company. Following the assassination of Alexander II of Russia, for which many blamed "the Jews", the 36 years beginning in 1881 experienced the largest wave of Jewish immigration to the United States. In 2012, the largest Jewish denominations were Orthodox, Haredi, and Conservative Judaism. Reform Jewish communities are prevalent through the area. 770 Eastern Parkway is the headquarters of the international Chabad Lubavitch movement, and is considered an icon, while Congregation Emanu-El of New York in Manhattan is the largest Reform synagogue in the world.

Islam 

Islam ranks as the third largest religion in New York City, following Christianity and Judaism, with estimates ranging between 600,000 and 1,000,000 observers of Islam, including 10% of the city's public school children. Given both the size and scale of the city, as well as its relative proxinity and accessibility by air transportation to the Middle East, North Africa, Central Asia, and South Asia, 22.3% of American Muslims live in New York City, with 1.5 million Muslims in the greater New York metropolitan area, representing the largest metropolitan Muslim population in the Western Hemisphere—and the most ethnically diverse Muslim population of any city in the world. Powers Street Mosque in Brooklyn is one of the oldest continuously operating mosques in the U.S., and represents the first Islamic organization in both the city and the state of New York.

Hinduism and other religious affiliations 

Following these three largest religious groups in New York City are Hinduism, Buddhism, Sikhism, Zoroastrianism, and a variety of other religions. As of 2023, 24% of Greater New Yorkers identified with no organized religious affiliation, including 4% Atheist.

Wealth and income disparity 

New York City, like other large cities, has a high degree of income disparity, as indicated by its Gini coefficient of 0.55 as of 2017. In the first quarter of 2014, the average weekly wage in New York County (Manhattan) was $2,749, representing the highest total among large counties in the United States. In 2022, New York City was home to the highest number of billionaires of any city in the world, including former Mayor Michael Bloomberg, with a total of 107. New York also had the highest density of millionaires per capita among major U.S. cities in 2014, at 4.6% of residents. New York City is one of the relatively few American cities levying an income tax (about 3%) on its residents. As of 2018, there were 78,676 homeless people in New York City.

Economy 

 

New York City is a global hub of business and commerce and an established safe haven for global investors, and is sometimes described as the capital of the world. The term global city was popularized by sociologist Saskia Sassen in her 1991 work, The Global City: New York, London, Tokyo. New York is a center for worldwide banking and finance, health care and life sciences, medical technology and research, retailing, world trade, transportation, tourism, real estate, new media, traditional media, advertising, legal services, accountancy, insurance, both musical and prose theater, fashion, and the arts in the United States; while Silicon Alley, metonymous for New York's broad-spectrum high technology sphere, continues to expand. The Port of New York and New Jersey is a major economic engine, handling a maritime cargo volume in the ten months through October 2022 of over 8.2 million TEUs, benefitting post-Panamax from the expansion of the Panama Canal, and accelerating ahead of California seaports in monthly cargo volumes.

Many Fortune 500 corporations are headquartered in New York City, as are a large number of multinational corporations. New York City has been ranked first among cities across the globe in attracting capital, business, and tourists. New York City's role as the top global center for the advertising industry is metonymously reflected as Madison Avenue. The city's fashion industry provides approximately 180,000 employees with $11 billion in annual wages. The non-profit Partnership for New York City, currently headed by Kathryn Wylde, is the city's pre-eminent private business association, comprising approximately 330 corporate leaders in membership. The fashion industry is based in Midtown Manhattan and is represented by the Council of Fashion Designers of America (CDFA), headquartered in Lower Manhattan.

Significant economic sectors also include non-profit institutions, and universities. Manufacturing declined over the 20th century but still accounts for significant employment. particularly in smaller operations. The city's apparel and garment industry, historically centered on the Garment District in Manhattan, peaked in 1950, when more than 323,000 workers were employed in the industry in New York. In 2015, fewer than 23,000 New York City residents were employed in the manufacture of garments, accessories, and finished textiles, although efforts to revive the industry were underway, and the American fashion industry continues to be metonymized as Seventh Avenue.

Chocolate is New York City's leading specialty-food export, with up to $234 million worth of exports each year. Godiva, one of the world's largest chocolatiers, is headquartered in Manhattan, and an unofficial chocolate district in Brooklyn is home to several chocolate makers and retailers. Food processing is a $5 billion industry that employs more than 19,000 residents.

Wall Street 

New York City's most important economic sector lies in its role as the headquarters for the U.S. financial industry, metonymously known as Wall Street. The city's securities industry continues to form the largest segment of the city's financial sector and is an important economic engine. Many large financial companies are headquartered in New York City, and the city is also home to a burgeoning number of financial startup companies.

Lower Manhattan is home to the New York Stock Exchange, at 11 Wall Street, and the Nasdaq, at 165 Broadway, representing the world's largest and second largest stock exchanges, respectively, when measured both by overall average daily trading volume and by total market capitalization of their listed companies in 2013. Investment banking fees on Wall Street totaled approximately $40 billion in 2012, while in 2013, senior New York City bank officers who manage risk and compliance functions earned as much as $324,000 annually. In fiscal year 2013–14, Wall Street's securities industry generated 19% of New York State's tax revenue.

New York City remains the largest global center for trading in public equity and debt capital markets, driven in part by the size and financial development of the U.S. economy. New York also leads in hedge fund management; private equity; and the monetary volume of mergers and acquisitions. Several investment banks and investment managers headquartered in Manhattan are important participants in other global financial centers. New York is also the principal commercial banking center of the United States.

Many of the world's largest media conglomerates are also based in the city. Manhattan contained over 500 million square feet (46.5 million m2) of office space in 2018, making it the largest office market in the United States, while Midtown Manhattan, with 400 million square feet (37.2 million m2) in 2018, is the largest central business district in the world.

Tech and biotech 

Silicon Alley, centered in New York, has evolved into a metonym for the sphere encompassing the metropolitan region's high technology industries involving the internet, new media, financial technology (fintech) and cryptocurrency, telecommunications, digital media, software development, biotechnology, game design, and other fields within information technology that are supported by its entrepreneurship ecosystem and venture capital investments.

Technology-driven startup companies and entrepreneurial employment are growing in New York City and the region. The technology sector has been claiming a greater share of New York City's economy since 2010. Tech:NYC, founded in 2016, is a non-profit organization which represents New York City's technology industry with government, civic institutions, in business, and in the media, and whose primary goals are to further augment New York's substantial tech talent base and to advocate for policies that will nurture tech companies to grow in the city.

The biotechnology sector is also growing in New York City, based upon the city's strength in academic scientific research and public and commercial financial support. On December 19, 2011, Mayor Michael R. Bloomberg announced his choice of Cornell University and Technion-Israel Institute of Technology to build a $2 billion graduate school of applied sciences called Cornell Tech on Roosevelt Island with the goal of transforming New York City into the world's premier technology capital. The New York City Economic Development Corporation's Early Stage Life Sciences Funding Initiative and venture capital partners, including Celgene, General Electric Ventures, and Eli Lilly, committed a minimum of $100 million to help launch 15 to 20 ventures in life sciences and biotechnology.

Real estate 

Real estate is a major force in the city's economy, as the total value of all New York City property was assessed at US$1.072 trillion for the 2017 fiscal year, an increase of 10.6% from the previous year, with 89% of the increase coming from market effects.

In 2014, Manhattan was home to six of the top ten ZIP codes in the United States by median housing price. In 2019, the most expensive home sale ever in the United States achieved completion in Manhattan, at a selling price of $238 million, for a  penthouse apartment overlooking Central Park. In 2022, one-bedroom apartments in Manhattan rented at a median monthly price of US$3,600.00, one of the world's highest. New York City real estate is a safe haven for global investors.

Tourism 

Tourism is a vital industry for New York City, and NYC & Company represents the city's official bureau of tourism. New York has witnessed a growing combined volume of international and domestic tourists, reflecting over 60million visitors to the city per year, the world's busiest tourist destination. Approximately 12 million visitors to New York City have been from outside the United States, with the highest numbers from the United Kingdom, Canada, Brazil, and China. Multiple sources have called New York the most photographed city in the world.

I Love New York (stylized I ❤ NY) is both a logo and a song that are the basis of an advertising campaign and have been used since 1977 to promote tourism in New York City, and later to promote New York State as well. The trademarked logo, owned by New York State Empire State Development, appears in souvenir shops and brochures throughout the city and state, some licensed, many not. The song is the state song of New York.

The majority of the most high-profile tourist destinations to the city are situated in Manhattan. These include Times Square; Broadway theater productions; the Empire State Building; the Statue of Liberty; Ellis Island; the United Nations headquarters; the World Trade Center (including the National September 11 Memorial & Museum and One World Trade Center); the art museums along Museum Mile; green spaces such as Central Park, Washington Square Park, the High Line, and the medieval gardens of The Cloisters; the Stonewall Inn; Rockefeller Center; ethnic enclaves including the Manhattan Chinatown, Koreatown, Curry Hill, Harlem, Spanish Harlem, Little Italy, and Little Australia; luxury shopping along Fifth and Madison Avenues; and events such as the Halloween Parade in Greenwich Village; the Brooklyn Bridge (shared with Brooklyn); the Macy's Thanksgiving Day Parade; the lighting of the Rockefeller Center Christmas Tree; the St. Patrick's Day Parade; seasonal activities such as ice skating in Central Park in the wintertime; the Tribeca Film Festival; and free performances in Central Park at SummerStage.

Points of interest have also developed in the city outside Manhattan and have made the outer boroughs tourist destinations in their own right. These include numerous ethnic enclaves; the Unisphere, Flushing Meadows–Corona Park, and Downtown Flushing in Queens; Downtown Brooklyn, Coney Island, Williamsburg, Park Slope, and Prospect Park in Brooklyn; the Bronx Zoo, the New York Botanical Garden, and the Grand Concourse in the Bronx; and the Staten Island Ferry shuttling passengers between Staten Island and the South Ferry Terminal bordering Battery Park in Lower Manhattan, at the historical birthplace of New York City.

Media and entertainment 

New York City has been described as the entertainment and digital media capital of the world. The city is a prominent location for the American entertainment industry, with many films, television series, books, and other media being set there. , New York City was the second-largest center for filmmaking and television production in the United States, producing about 200 feature films annually, employing 130,000 individuals. The filmed entertainment industry has been growing in New York, contributing nearly $9 billion to the New York City economy alone as of 2015. By volume, New York is the world leader in independent film production—one-third of all American independent films are produced there. The Association of Independent Commercial Producers is also based in New York. In the first five months of 2014 alone, location filming for television pilots in New York City exceeded the record production levels for all of 2013, with New York surpassing Los Angeles as the top North American city for the same distinction during the 2013–2014 cycle.

New York City is the center for the advertising, music, newspaper, digital media, and publishing industries and is also the largest media market in North America. Some of the city's media conglomerates and institutions include Warner Bros. Discovery, the Thomson Reuters Corporation, the Associated Press, Bloomberg L.P., the News Corp, The New York Times Company, NBCUniversal, the Hearst Corporation, AOL, Fox Corporation, and Paramount Global. Seven of the world's top eight global advertising agency networks have their headquarters in New York. Two of the top three record labels' headquarters are in New York: Sony Music Entertainment and Warner Music Group. Universal Music Group also has offices in New York. New media enterprises are contributing an increasingly important component to the city's central role in the media sphere.

More than 200 newspapers and 350 consumer magazines have an office in the city, and the publishing industry employs about 25,000 people. Two of the three national daily newspapers with the largest circulations in the United States are published in New York: The Wall Street Journal and The New York Times (NYT). Nicknamed "the Grey Lady", the NYT has won the most Pulitzer Prizes for journalism and is considered the U.S. media's newspaper of record. Tabloid newspapers in the city include the New York Daily News, which was founded in 1919 by Joseph Medill Patterson, and The New York Post, founded in 1801 by Alexander Hamilton. At the local news end of the media spectrum, Patch Media is also headquartered in Manhattan.

New York City also has a comprehensive ethnic press, with 270 newspapers and magazines published in more than 40 languages. El Diario La Prensa is New York's largest Spanish-language daily and the oldest in the nation. The New York Amsterdam News, published in Harlem, is a prominent African American newspaper. The Village Voice, historically the largest alternative newspaper in the United States, announced in 2017 that it would cease publication of its print edition and convert to a fully digital venture.
The television and radio industry developed in New York and is a significant employer in the city's economy. The three major American broadcast networks are all headquartered in New York: ABC, CBS, and NBC. Many cable networks are based in the city as well, including CNN, MSNBC, MTV, Fox News, HBO, Showtime, Bravo, Food Network, AMC, and Comedy Central. News 12 Networks operated News 12 The Bronx and News 12 Brooklyn. WBAI, with news and information programming, is one of the few socialist radio stations operating in the United States.

New York is also a major center for non-commercial educational media. NYC Media is the official public radio, television, and online media network and broadcasting service of New York City, and this network has produced several original Emmy Award-winning shows covering music and culture in city neighborhoods and city government. The oldest public-access television channel in the United States is the Manhattan Neighborhood Network, founded in 1971. WNET is the city's major public television station and a primary source of national Public Broadcasting Service (PBS) television programming. WNYC, a public radio station owned by the city until 1997, has the largest public radio audience in the United States.

Climate resiliency 

As an oceanic port city, New York City is vulnerable to the long-term manifestations of global warming and rising seas. Climate change has spawned the development of a significant climate resiliency and environmental sustainability economy in the city. Governors Island is slated to host a US$1billion research and education center intended to establish New York’s role as the global leader in addressing the climate crisis.

Education 

 

New York City has the largest educational system of any city in the world. The city’s educational infrastructure spans primary education, secondary education, higher education, and research.

Primary and secondary education 
The New York City Public Schools system, managed by the New York City Department of Education, is the largest public school system in the United States, serving about 1.1 million students in more than 1,700 separate primary and secondary schools. The city's public school system includes nine specialized high schools to serve academically and artistically gifted students. The city government pays the Pelham Public Schools to educate a very small, detached section of the Bronx.

The New York City Charter School Center assists the setup of new charter schools. There are approximately 900 additional privately run secular and religious schools in the city.

Higher education and research 

More than a million students, the highest number of any city in the United States, are enrolled in New York City's more than 120 higher education institutions, with more than half a million in the City University of New York (CUNY) system alone , including both degree and professional programs. According to Academic Ranking of World Universities, New York City has, on average, the best higher education institutions of any global city.

The public CUNY system is one of the largest universities in the nation, comprising 25 institutions across all five boroughs: senior colleges, community colleges, and other graduate/professional schools. The public State University of New York (SUNY) system includes campuses in New York City, including SUNY Downstate Health Sciences University, Fashion Institute of Technology, SUNY Maritime College, and SUNY College of Optometry.

New York City is home to such notable private universities as Barnard College, Columbia University, Cooper Union, Fordham University, New York University, New York Institute of Technology, Rockefeller University, and Yeshiva University; several of these universities are ranked among the top universities in the world, while some of the world's most prestigious institutions like Princeton University and Yale University remain in the New York metropolitan area.

The city also hosts other smaller private colleges and universities, including many religious and special-purpose institutions, such as Pace University, St. John's University, The Juilliard School, Manhattan College, Adelphi University - Manhattan, Mercy College (New York), The College of Mount Saint Vincent, Parsons School of Design, The New School, Pratt Institute, New York Film Academy, The School of Visual Arts, The King's College, Marymount Manhattan College, and Wagner College.

Much of the scientific research in the city is done in medicine and the life sciences. In 2019, the New York metropolitan area ranked first on the list of cities and metropolitan areas by share of published articles in life sciences. New York City has the most postgraduate life sciences degrees awarded annually in the United States, and in 2012, 43,523 licensed physicians were practicing in New York City. There are 127 Nobel laureates with roots in local institutions .

Major biomedical research institutions include Memorial Sloan Kettering Cancer Center, Rockefeller University, SUNY Downstate Medical Center, Albert Einstein College of Medicine, Mount Sinai School of Medicine, and Weill Cornell Medical College, being joined by the Cornell University/Technion-Israel Institute of Technology venture on Roosevelt Island. The graduates of SUNY Maritime College in the Bronx earned the highest average annual salary of any university graduates in the United States, $144,000 as of 2017.

Human resources

Public health 

The New York City Health and Hospitals Corporation (HHC) operates the public hospitals and outpatient clinics in New York City. HHC was created in 1969 by the New York State Legislature as a public benefit corporation (Chapter 1016 of the Laws 1969). HHC operates 11 acute care hospitals, five nursing homes, six diagnostic and treatment centers, and more than 70 community-based primary care sites, serving primarily the poor and working class. HHC's MetroPlus Health Plan is one of the New York area's largest providers of government-sponsored health insurance and is the plan of choice for nearly half a million New Yorkers.

HHC's facilities annually provide millions of New Yorkers services interpreted in more than 190 languages. The most well-known hospital in the HHC system is Bellevue Hospital, the oldest public hospital in the United States. Bellevue is the designated hospital for treatment of the President of the United States and other world leaders if they become sick or injured while in New York City. The president of HHC is Ramanathan Raju, MD, a surgeon and former CEO of the Cook County health system in Illinois. In August 2017, Mayor Bill de Blasio signed legislation outlawing pharmacies from selling cigarettes once their existing licenses to do so expired, beginning in 2018.

Public safety

Police and law enforcement 

The New York Police Department (NYPD) has been the largest police force in the United States by a significant margin, with more than 35,000 sworn officers. Members of the NYPD are frequently referred to by politicians, the media, and their own police cars by the nickname, New York's Finest.

Crime overall has trended downward in New York City since the 1990s. In 2012, the NYPD came under scrutiny for its use of a stop-and-frisk program, which has undergone several policy revisions since then. In 2014, New York City had the third-lowest murder rate among the largest U.S. cities, having become significantly safer after a spike in crime in the 1970s through 1990s. Violent crime in New York City decreased more than 75% from 1993 to 2005, and continued decreasing during periods when the nation as a whole saw increases. By 2002, New York City was ranked 197th in crime among the 216 U.S. cities with populations greater than 100,000. In 1992, the city recorded 2,245 murders. In 2005, the homicide rate was at its lowest level since 1966, and in 2009, the city recorded fewer than 461 homicides for the first time ever since crime statistics were first published in 1963. In 2017, 60.1% of violent crime suspects were Black, 29.6% Hispanic, 6.5% White, 3.6% Asian and 0.2% American Indian. New York City experienced 292 homicides in 2017.

Sociologists and criminologists have not reached consensus on the explanation for the dramatic long-term decrease in the city's crime rate. Some attribute the phenomenon to new tactics used by the NYPD, including its use of CompStat and the broken windows theory. Others cite the end of the crack epidemic and demographic changes, including from immigration. Another theory is that widespread exposure to lead pollution from automobile exhaust, which can lower intelligence and increase aggression levels, incited the initial crime wave in the mid-20th century, most acutely affecting heavily trafficked cities like New York. A strong correlation was found demonstrating that violent crime rates in New York and other big cities began to fall after lead was removed from American gasoline in the 1970s. Another theory cited to explain New York City's falling homicide rate is the inverse correlation between the number of murders and the increasingly wet climate in the city.

Organized crime has long been associated with New York City, beginning with the Forty Thieves and the Roach Guards in the Five Points neighborhood in the 1820s, followed by the Tongs in the same neighborhood, which ultimately evolved into Chinatown, Manhattan. The 20th century saw a rise in the Mafia, dominated by the Five Families, as well as in gangs, including the Black Spades. The Mafia and gang presence has declined in the city in the 21st century.

Firefighting 

The Fire Department of New York (FDNY) provides fire protection, technical rescue, primary response to biological, chemical, and radioactive hazards, and emergency medical services for the five boroughs of New York City. The FDNY is the largest municipal fire department in the United States and the second largest in the world after the Tokyo Fire Department. The FDNY employs approximately 11,080 uniformed firefighters and more than 3,300 uniformed EMTs and paramedics. The FDNY's motto is New York's Bravest.

The fire department faces multifaceted firefighting challenges in many ways unique to New York. In addition to responding to building types that range from wood-frame single family homes to high-rise structures, the FDNY also responds to fires that occur in the New York City Subway. Secluded bridges and tunnels, as well as large parks and wooded areas that can give rise to brush fires, also present challenges.

The FDNY is headquartered at 9 MetroTech Center in Downtown Brooklyn, and the FDNY Fire Academy is on the Randalls Island. There are three Bureau of Fire Communications alarm offices which receive and dispatch alarms to appropriate units. One office, at 11 Metrotech Center in Brooklyn, houses Manhattan/Citywide, Brooklyn, and Staten Island Fire Communications; the Bronx and Queens offices are in separate buildings.

Public library system 

The New York Public Library (NYPL), which has the largest collection of any public library system in the United States. Queens is served by the Queens Borough Public Library (QPL), the nation's second-largest public library system, while the Brooklyn Public Library (BPL) serves Brooklyn.

In 2013, the New York Public Library and the Brooklyn Public Library announced that they would merge their technical services departments into a new department called BookOps. This proposed merger anticipated a savings of $2 million for the Brooklyn Public Library and $1.5 million for the New York Public Library. Although not currently part of the merger, it is expected that the Queens Public Library will eventually share some resources with the other city libraries.

Culture and contemporary life 

New York City has been described as the cultural capital of the world by Manhattan's Baruch College. A book containing a series of essays titled New York, Culture Capital of the World, 1940–1965 has also been published as showcased by the National Library of Australia. In describing New York, author Tom Wolfe said, "Culture just seems to be in the air, like part of the weather."

Numerous major American cultural movements began in the city, such as the Harlem Renaissance, which established the African-American literary canon in the United States. The city became the center of stand-up comedy in the early 20th century, jazz in the 1940s, abstract expressionism in the 1950s, and the birthplace of hip-hop in the 1970s. The city's punk and hardcore scenes were influential in the 1970s and 1980s. New York has long had a flourishing scene for Jewish American literature.

The city is the birthplace of many cultural movements, including the Harlem Renaissance in literature and visual art; abstract expressionism (also known as the New York School) in painting; and hip-hop, punk, salsa, freestyle, Tin Pan Alley, certain forms of jazz, and (along with Philadelphia) disco in music. New York City has been considered the dance capital of the world. The city is also frequently the setting for novels, movies (see List of films set in New York City), and television programs. New York Fashion Week is one of the world's preeminent fashion events and is afforded extensive coverage by the media. New York has also frequently been ranked the top fashion capital of the world on the annual list compiled by the Global Language Monitor.

Pace 

One of the most common traits attributed to New York City is its fast pace, which spawned the term New York minute. Journalist Walt Whitman characterized New York's streets as being traversed by "hurrying, feverish, electric crowds".

Arts 

New York City has more than 2,000 arts and cultural organizations and more than 500 art galleries. The city government funds the arts with a larger annual budget than the National Endowment for the Arts. Wealthy business magnates in the 19th century built a network of major cultural institutions, such as Carnegie Hall and the Metropolitan Museum of Art, which have become internationally renowned. The advent of electric lighting led to elaborate theater productions, and in the 1880s, New York City theaters on Broadway and along 42nd Street began featuring a new stage form that became known as the Broadway musical. Strongly influenced by the city's immigrants, productions such as those of Harrigan and Hart, George M. Cohan, and others used song in narratives that often reflected themes of hope and ambition. New York City itself is the subject or background of many plays and musicals.

Performing arts 

Broadway theatre is one of the premier forms of English-language theatre in the world, named after Broadway, the major thoroughfare that crosses Times Square, also sometimes referred to as "The Great White Way". Forty-one venues in Midtown Manhattan's Theatre District, each with at least 500 seats, are classified as Broadway theatres. According to The Broadway League, Broadway shows sold approximately $1.27 billion worth of tickets in the 2013–2014 season, an 11.4% increase from $1.139 billion in the 2012–2013 season. Attendance in 2013–2014 stood at 12.21 million, representing a 5.5% increase from the 2012–2013 season's 11.57 million. Performance artists displaying diverse skills are ubiquitous on the streets of Manhattan.

Lincoln Center for the Performing Arts, anchoring Lincoln Square on the Upper West Side of Manhattan, is home to numerous influential arts organizations, including the Metropolitan Opera, New York City Opera, New York Philharmonic, and New York City Ballet, as well as the Vivian Beaumont Theater, the Juilliard School, Jazz at Lincoln Center, and Alice Tully Hall. The Lee Strasberg Theatre and Film Institute is in Union Square, and Tisch School of the Arts is based at New York University, while Central Park SummerStage presents free music concerts in Central Park.

Visual arts 

New York City is home to hundreds of cultural institutions and historic sites. Museum Mile is the name for a section of Fifth Avenue running from 82nd to 105th streets on the Upper East Side of Manhattan, in an area sometimes called Upper Carnegie Hill. Nine museums occupy the length of this section of Fifth Avenue, making it one of the densest displays of culture in the world. Its art museums include the Guggenheim, Metropolitan Museum of Art, Neue Galerie New York, and The Africa Center, which opened in late 2012. In addition to other programming, the museums collaborate for the annual Museum Mile Festival, held each year in June, to promote the museums and increase visitation. Many of the world's most lucrative art auctions are held in New York City.

Cuisine 

New York City's food culture includes an array of international cuisines influenced by the city's immigrant history. Central and Eastern European immigrants, especially Jewish immigrants from those regions, brought bagels, cheesecake, hot dogs, knishes, and delicatessens (delis) to the city. Italian immigrants brought New York-style pizza and Italian cuisine into the city, while Jewish immigrants and Irish immigrants brought pastrami and corned beef, respectively. Chinese and other Asian restaurants, sandwich joints, trattorias, diners, and coffeehouses are ubiquitous throughout the city. Some 4,000 mobile food vendors licensed by the city, many immigrant-owned, have made Middle Eastern foods such as falafel and kebabs examples of modern New York street food. The city is home to "nearly one thousand of the finest and most diverse haute cuisine restaurants in the world", according to Michelin. The New York City Department of Health and Mental Hygiene assigns letter grades to the city's restaurants based upon their inspection results. As of 2019, there were 27,043 restaurants in the city, up from 24,865 in 2017. The Queens Night Market in Flushing Meadows–Corona Park attracts more than ten thousand people nightly to sample food from more than 85 countries.

Parades 

New York City is well known for its street parades, which celebrate a broad array of themes, including holidays, nationalities, human rights, and major league sports team championship victories. The majority of parades are held in Manhattan. The primary orientation of the annual street parades is typically from north to south, marching along major avenues. The annual Macy's Thanksgiving Day Parade is the world's largest parade, beginning alongside Central Park and processing southward to the flagship Macy's Herald Square store; the parade is viewed on telecasts worldwide and draws millions of spectators in person. Other notable parades including the annual New York City St. Patrick's Day Parade in March, the LGBT Pride March in June, the Greenwich Village Halloween Parade in October, and numerous parades commemorating the independence days of many nations. Ticker-tape parades celebrating championships won by sports teams as well as other heroic accomplishments march northward along the Canyon of Heroes on Broadway from Bowling Green to City Hall Park in Lower Manhattan.

Accent and dialect 

The New York area is home to a distinctive regional accent and speech pattern called the New York dialect, alternatively known as Brooklynese or New Yorkese. It has generally been considered one of the most recognizable accents within American English.

The traditional New York area speech pattern is known for its rapid delivery, and its accent is characterized as non-rhotic so that the sound  does not appear at the end of a syllable or immediately before a consonant; therefore the pronunciation of the city name as "New Yawk." In another feature called the low back chain shift, the  vowel sound of words like talk, law, cross, chocolate, and coffee and the often homophonous  in core and more are tensed and usually raised more than in General American English. In the most old-fashioned and extreme versions of the New York dialect, the vowel sounds of words like "girl" and of words like "oil" became a diphthong . This is often misperceived by speakers of other accents as a reversal of the er and oy sounds, so that girl is pronounced "goil" and oil is pronounced "erl"; this leads to the caricature of New Yorkers saying things like "Joizey" (Jersey), "Toidy-Toid Street" (33rd St.) and "terlet" (toilet). The character Archie Bunker from the 1970s television sitcom All in the Family was an example of this pattern of speech.

The classic version of the New York City dialect is generally centered on middle and working-class New Yorkers. The influx of non-European immigrants in recent decades has led to changes in this distinctive dialect, and the traditional form of this speech pattern is no longer as prevalent among general New Yorkers as it has been in the past.

Sports 

New York City is home to the headquarters of the National Football League, Major League Baseball, the National Basketball Association, the National Hockey League, and Major League Soccer. The New York metropolitan area hosts the most sports teams in the first four major North American professional sports leagues with nine, one more than Los Angeles, and has 11 top-level professional sports teams if Major League Soccer is included, also one more than Los Angeles. Participation in professional sports in the city predates all professional leagues.

The city has played host to more than 40 major professional teams in the five sports and their respective competing leagues. Four of the ten most expensive stadiums ever built worldwide (MetLife Stadium, the new Yankee Stadium, Madison Square Garden, and Citi Field) are in the New York metropolitan area. Madison Square Garden, its predecessor, the original Yankee Stadium and Ebbets Field, are sporting venues in New York City, the latter two having been commemorated on U.S. postage stamps. New York was the first of eight American cities to have won titles in all four major leagues (MLB, NHL, NFL and NBA), having done so following the Knicks' 1970 title. In 1972, it became the first city to win titles in five sports when the Cosmos won the NASL final.

Baseball
New York has been described as the "Capital of Baseball". There have been 35 Major League Baseball World Series and 73 pennants won by New York teams. It is one of only five metro areas (Los Angeles, Chicago, Baltimore–Washington, and the San Francisco Bay Area being the others) to have two baseball teams.

The city's two Major League Baseball teams are the New York Mets, who play at Citi Field in Queens, and the New York Yankees, who play at Yankee Stadium in the Bronx. These teams compete in six games of interleague play every regular season that has also come to be called the Subway Series. The Yankees have won a record 27 championships, while the Mets have won the World Series twice. The city also was once home to the Brooklyn Dodgers (now the Los Angeles Dodgers), who won the World Series once, and the New York Giants (now the San Francisco Giants), who won the World Series five times. Both teams moved to California in 1958. There is also one Minor League Baseball team in the city, the Mets-affiliated Brooklyn Cyclones, and the city gained a club in the independent Atlantic League when the Staten Island FerryHawks began play in 2022.

American Football
The city is represented in the National Football League by the New York Giants and the New York Jets, although both teams play their home games at MetLife Stadium in nearby East Rutherford, New Jersey, which hosted Super Bowl XLVIII in 2014.

Hockey
The metropolitan area is home to three National Hockey League teams. The New York Rangers, the traditional representative of the city itself and one of the league's Original Six, play at Madison Square Garden in Manhattan. The New York Islanders, traditionally representing Nassau and Suffolk Counties of Long Island, play in UBS Arena in Elmont, New York, and played in Brooklyn's Barclays Center from 2015 to 2020. The New Jersey Devils play at Prudential Center in nearby Newark, New Jersey and traditionally represent the counties of neighboring New Jersey which are coextensive with the boundaries of the New York metropolitan area and media market.

Basketball
The city's National Basketball Association teams are the Brooklyn Nets (previously known as the New York Nets and New Jersey Nets as they moved around the metropolitan area) and the New York Knicks, while the New York Liberty is the city's Women's National Basketball Association team. The first national college-level basketball championship, the National Invitation Tournament, was held in New York in 1938 and remains in the city. The city is well known for its links to basketball, which is played in nearly every park in the city by local youth, many of whom have gone on to play for major college programs and in the NBA.

Soccer
In soccer, New York City is represented by New York City FC of Major League Soccer, who play their home games at Yankee Stadium and the New York Red Bulls, who play their home games at Red Bull Arena in nearby Harrison, New Jersey. NJ/NY Gotham FC also plays their home games in Red Bull Arena, representing the metropolitan area in the National Women's Soccer League. Historically, the city is known for the New York Cosmos, the highly successful former professional soccer team which was the American home of Pelé. A new version of the New York Cosmos was formed in 2010, and most recently played in the third-division National Independent Soccer Association before going on hiatus in January 2021. New York was a host city for the 1994 FIFA World Cup and will be one of eleven US host cities for the 2026 FIFA World Cup.

Tennis
The annual United States Open Tennis Championships is one of the world's four Grand Slam tennis tournaments and is held at the National Tennis Center in Flushing Meadows–Corona Park, Queens. The New York City Marathon, which courses through all five boroughs, is the world's largest running marathon, with 51,394 finishers in 2016 and 98,247 applicants for the 2017 race. The Millrose Games is an annual track and field meet whose featured event is the Wanamaker Mile. Boxing is also a prominent part of the city's sporting scene, with events like the Amateur Boxing Golden Gloves being held at Madison Square Garden each year. The city is also considered the host of the Belmont Stakes, the last, longest and oldest of horse racing's Triple Crown races, held just over the city's border at Belmont Park on the first or second Sunday of June. The city also hosted the 1932 U.S. Open golf tournament and the 1930 and 1939 PGA Championships, and has been host city for both events several times, most notably for nearby Winged Foot Golf Club. The Gaelic games are played in Riverdale, Bronx at Gaelic Park, home to the New York GAA, the only North American team to compete at the senior inter-county level.

International events
In terms of hosting multi-sport events, New York City hosted the 1984 Summer Paralympics and the 1998 Goodwill Games. New York City's bid to host the 2012 Summer Olympics was one of five finalists, but lost out to London.

Environment 

 

Environmental issues in New York City are affected by the city's size, density, abundant public transportation infrastructure, and its location at the mouth of the Hudson River. For example, it is one of the country's biggest sources of pollution and has the lowest per-capita greenhouse gas emissions rate and electricity usage. Governors Island is planned to host a US$1billion research and education center to make New York City the global leader in addressing the climate crisis.

Environmental impact reduction 

New York City has focused on reducing its environmental impact and carbon footprint. Mass transit use in New York City is the highest in the United States. Also, by 2010, the city had 3,715 hybrid taxis and other clean diesel vehicles, representing around 28% of New York's taxi fleet in service, the most of any city in North America. New York City is the host of Climate Week NYC, the largest Climate Week to take place globally and regarded as major annual climate summit.

New York's high rate of public transit use, more than 200,000 daily cyclists , and many pedestrian commuters make it the most energy-efficient major city in the United States. Walk and bicycle modes of travel account for 21% of all modes for trips in the city; nationally the rate for metro regions is about 8%. In both its 2011 and 2015 rankings, Walk Score named New York City the most walkable large city in the United States, and in 2018, Stacker ranked New York the most walkable U.S. city. Citibank sponsored the introduction of 10,000 public bicycles for the city's bike-share project in the summer of 2013. New York City's numerical "in-season cycling indicator" of bicycling in the city had hit an all-time high of 437 when measured in 2014.

The city government was a petitioner in the landmark Massachusetts v. Environmental Protection Agency Supreme Court case forcing the EPA to regulate greenhouse gases as pollutants. The city is a leader in the construction of energy-efficient green office buildings, including the Hearst Tower among others. Mayor Bill de Blasio has committed to an 80% reduction in greenhouse gas emissions between 2014 and 2050 to reduce the city's contributions to climate change, beginning with a comprehensive "Green Buildings" plan.

Water purity and availability 

The New York City drinking water supply is extracted from the protected Catskill Mountains watershed. As a result of the watershed's integrity and undisturbed natural water filtration system, New York is one of only four major cities in the United States the majority of whose drinking water is pure enough not to require purification through water treatment plants. The city's municipal water system is the largest in the United States, moving over one billion gallons of water per day; a leak in the Delaware aqueduct results in some 20 million gallons a day being lost under the Hudson River. The Croton Watershed north of the city is undergoing construction of a $3.2 billion water purification plant to augment New York City's water supply by an estimated 290 million gallons daily, representing a greater than 20% addition to the city's current availability of water. The ongoing expansion of New York City Water Tunnel No. 3, an integral part of the New York City water supply system, is the largest capital construction project in the city's history, with segments serving Manhattan and the Bronx completed, and with segments serving Brooklyn and Queens planned for construction in 2020. In 2018, New York City announced a $1 billion investment to protect the integrity of its water system and to maintain the purity of its unfiltered water supply.

Air quality 

According to the 2016 World Health Organization Global Urban Ambient Air Pollution Database, the annual average concentration in New York City's air of particulate matter measuring 2.5micrometers or less (PM2.5) was 7.0micrograms per cubic meter, or 3.0micrograms within the recommended limit of the WHO Air Quality Guidelines for the annual mean PM2.5. The New York City Department of Health and Mental Hygiene, in partnership with Queens College, conducts the New York Community Air Survey to measure pollutants at about 150 locations.

Environmental revitalization 

Newtown Creek, a  a long estuary that forms part of the border between the boroughs of Brooklyn and Queens, has been designated a Superfund site for environmental clean-up and remediation of the waterway's recreational and economic resources for many communities. One of the most heavily used bodies of water in the Port of New York and New Jersey, it had been one of the most contaminated industrial sites in the country, containing years of discarded toxins, an estimated  of spilled oil, including the Greenpoint oil spill, raw sewage from New York City's sewer system, and other accumulation.

Government and politics

Government 

New York City has been a metropolitan municipality with a Strong mayor–council form of government since its consolidation in 1898. In New York City, the city government is responsible for public education, correctional institutions, public safety, recreational facilities, sanitation, water supply, and welfare services.

The mayor and council members are elected to four-year terms. The City Council is a unicameral body consisting of 51 council members whose districts are defined by geographic population boundaries. Each term for the mayor and council members lasts four years and has a two consecutive-term limit, which is reset after a four-year break. The New York City Administrative Code, the New York City Rules, and the City Record are the code of local laws, compilation of regulations, and official journal, respectively.

Each borough is coextensive with a judicial district of the state Unified Court System, of which the Criminal Court and the Civil Court are the local courts, while the New York Supreme Court conducts major trials and appeals. Manhattan hosts the First Department of the Supreme Court, Appellate Division while Brooklyn hosts the Second Department. There are also several extrajudicial administrative courts, which are executive agencies and not part of the state Unified Court System.

Uniquely among major American cities, New York is divided between, and is host to the main branches of, two different U.S. district courts: the District Court for the Southern District of New York, whose main courthouse is on Foley Square near City Hall in Manhattan and whose jurisdiction includes Manhattan and the Bronx; and the District Court for the Eastern District of New York, whose main courthouse is in Brooklyn and whose jurisdiction includes Brooklyn, Queens, and Staten Island. The U.S. Court of Appeals for the Second Circuit and U.S. Court of International Trade are also based in New York, also on Foley Square in Manhattan.

Politics 
The present mayor is Eric Adams. He was elected in 2021 with 67% of the vote, and assumed office on January 1, 2022.

The Democratic Party holds the majority of public offices. As of April 2016, 69% of registered voters in the city are Democrats and 10% are Republicans. New York City has not been carried by a Republican  presidential election since President Calvin Coolidge won the five boroughs in 1924. A Republican candidate for statewide office has not won all five boroughs of the city since it was incorporated in 1898. In 2012, Democrat Barack Obama became the first presidential candidate of any party to receive more than 80% of the overall vote in New York City, sweeping all five boroughs. Party platforms center on affordable housing, education, and economic development, and labor politics are of importance in the city. Thirteen out of 27 U.S. congressional districts in the state of New York include portions of New York City.

New York is one of the most important sources of political fundraising in the United States. At least four of the top five ZIP Codes in the nation for political contributions were in Manhattan for the 2004, 2006, and 2008 elections. The top ZIP Code, 10021 on the Upper East Side, generated the most money for the 2004 presidential campaigns of George W. Bush and John Kerry. The city has a strong imbalance of payments with the national and state governments. It receives 83 cents in services for every $1 it sends to the federal government in taxes (or annually sends $11.4 billion more than it receives back). City residents and businesses also sent an additional $4.1 billion in the 2009–2010 fiscal year to the state of New York than the city received in return.

Transportation 

New York City's comprehensive transportation system is both complex and extensive.

Rapid transit 
Mass transit in New York City, most of which runs 24 hours a day, accounts for one in every three users of mass transit in the United States, and two-thirds of the nation's rail riders live in the New York City metropolitan area.

Rail 

Nearly all of New York's subway system is open 24 hours a day, in contrast to the overnight shutdown common to systems in most cities, including Hong Kong, London, Paris, Seoul, and Tokyo. The New York City Subway is also the busiest metropolitan rail transit system in the Western Hemisphere, with 1.76 billion passenger rides in 2015, while Grand Central Terminal, also referred to as "Grand Central Station", is the world's largest railway station by number of train platforms.

Public transport is widely used in New York City. 54.6% of New Yorkers commuted to work in 2005 using mass transit. This is in contrast to the rest of the United States, where 91% of commuters travel in automobiles to their workplace. According to the New York City Comptroller, workers in the New York City area spend an average of 6hours and 18 minutes getting to work each week, the longest commute time in the nation among large cities. New York is the only U.S. city in which a majority (52%) of households do not have a car; only 22% of Manhattanites own a car. Due to their high usage of mass transit, New Yorkers spend less of their household income on transportation than the national average, saving $19 billion annually on transportation compared to other urban Americans.

New York City's commuter rail network is the largest in North America. The rail network, connecting New York City to its suburbs, consists of the Long Island Rail Road, Metro-North Railroad, and New Jersey Transit. The combined systems converge at Grand Central Terminal and Pennsylvania Station and contain more than 250 stations and 20 rail lines. In Queens, the elevated AirTrain people mover system connects 24 hours a day JFK International Airport to the New York City Subway and the Long Island Rail Road; a separate AirTrain system is planned alongside the Grand Central Parkway to connect LaGuardia Airport to these transit systems. For inter-city rail, New York City is served by Amtrak, whose busiest station by a significant margin is Pennsylvania Station on the West Side of Manhattan, from which Amtrak provides connections to Boston, Philadelphia, and Washington, D.C. along the Northeast Corridor, and long-distance train service to other North American cities.

The Staten Island Railway rapid transit system solely serves Staten Island, operating 24 hours a day. The Port Authority Trans-Hudson (PATH train) links Midtown and Lower Manhattan to northeastern New Jersey, primarily Hoboken, Jersey City, and Newark. Like the New York City Subway, the PATH operates 24 hours a day; meaning three of the six rapid transit systems in the world which operate on 24-hour schedules are wholly or partly in New York (the others are a portion of the Chicago "L", the PATCO Speedline serving Philadelphia, and the Copenhagen Metro).

Multibillion-dollar heavy rail transit projects under construction in New York City include the Second Avenue Subway, and the East Side Access project.

Buses 

New York City's public bus fleet runs 24/7 and is the largest in North America. The Port Authority Bus Terminal, the main intercity bus terminal of the city, serves 7,000 buses and 200,000 commuters daily, making it the busiest bus station in the world.

Air 

New York's airspace is the busiest in the United States and one of the world's busiest air transportation corridors. The three busiest airports in the New York metropolitan area include John F. Kennedy International Airport, Newark Liberty International Airport, and LaGuardia Airport; 130.5 million travelers used these three airports in 2016.

Plans have advanced to expand passenger volume at a fourth airport, Stewart International Airport near Newburgh, New York, by the Port Authority of New York and New Jersey. Plans were announced in July 2015 to entirely rebuild LaGuardia Airport in a multibillion-dollar project to replace its aging facilities. Other commercial airports in or serving the New York metropolitan area include Long Island MacArthur Airport, Trenton–Mercer Airport and Westchester County Airport. The primary general aviation airport serving the area is Teterboro Airport.

Ferries 

The Staten Island Ferry is the world's busiest ferry route, carrying more than 23 million passengers from July 2015 through June 2016 on the  route between Staten Island and Lower Manhattan and running 24 hours a day. Other ferry systems shuttle commuters between Manhattan and other locales within the city and the metropolitan area.

NYC Ferry, a NYCEDC initiative with routes planned to travel to all five boroughs, was launched in 2017, with second graders choosing the names of the ferries. Meanwhile, Seastreak ferry announced construction of a 600-passenger high-speed luxury ferry in September 2016, to shuttle riders between the Jersey Shore and Manhattan, anticipated to start service in 2017; this would be the largest vessel in its class.

Taxis, vehicles for hire, and trams

Other features of the city's transportation infrastructure encompass 13,587 yellow taxicabs; other vehicle for hire companies; and the Roosevelt Island Tramway, an aerial tramway that transports commuters between Roosevelt Island and Manhattan Island.

Streets and highways 

Despite New York's heavy reliance on its vast public transit system, streets are a defining feature of the city. The Commissioners' Plan of 1811 greatly influenced the city's physical development. Several of the city's streets and avenues, including Broadway, Wall Street, Madison Avenue, and Seventh Avenue are also used as metonyms for national industries there: the theater, finance, advertising, and fashion organizations, respectively.

New York City also has an extensive web of freeways and parkways, which link the city's boroughs to each other and to North Jersey, Westchester County, Long Island, and southwestern Connecticut through various bridges and tunnels. Because these highways serve millions of outer borough and suburban residents who commute into Manhattan, it is quite common for motorists to be stranded for hours in traffic congestion that are a daily occurrence, particularly during rush hour. Congestion pricing in New York City will go into effect in 2022 at the earliest.

New York City is also known for its rules regarding turning at red lights. Unlike the rest of the United States, New York State prohibits right or left turns on red in cities with a population greater than one million, to reduce traffic collisions and increase pedestrian safety. In New York City, therefore, all turns at red lights are illegal unless a sign permitting such maneuvers is present.

River crossings 

New York City is located on one of the world's largest natural harbors, and the boroughs of Manhattan and Staten Island are primarily coterminous with islands of the same names, while Queens and Brooklyn are at the west end of the larger Long Island, and the Bronx is on New York State's mainland. This situation of boroughs separated by water led to the development of an extensive infrastructure of bridges and tunnels.

The George Washington Bridge is the world's busiest motor vehicle bridge, connecting Manhattan to Bergen County, New Jersey. The Verrazzano-Narrows Bridge is the longest suspension bridge in the Americas and one of the world's longest. The Brooklyn Bridge is an icon of the city itself. The towers of the Brooklyn Bridge are built of limestone, granite, and Rosendale cement, and their architectural style is neo-Gothic, with characteristic pointed arches above the passageways through the stone towers. This bridge was also the longest suspension bridge in the world from its opening until 1903, and is the first steel-wire suspension bridge. The Queensboro Bridge is an important piece of cantilever architecture. The Manhattan Bridge, opened in 1909, is considered to be the forerunner of modern suspension bridges, and its design served as the model for many of the long-span suspension bridges around the world; the Manhattan Bridge, Throgs Neck Bridge, Triborough Bridge, and Verrazano-Narrows Bridge are all examples of structural expressionism.

Manhattan Island is linked to New York City's outer boroughs and to New Jersey. The Lincoln Tunnel, which carries 120,000 vehicles a day under the Hudson River between New Jersey and Midtown Manhattan, is the busiest vehicular tunnel in the world. The tunnel was built instead of a bridge to allow unfettered passage of large passenger and cargo ships that sailed through New York Harbor and up the Hudson River to Manhattan's piers. The Holland Tunnel, connecting Lower Manhattan to Jersey City, New Jersey, was the world's first mechanically ventilated vehicular tunnel when it opened in 1927. The Queens–Midtown Tunnel, built to relieve congestion on the bridges connecting Manhattan with Queens and Brooklyn, was the largest non-federal project in its time when it was completed in 1940. President Franklin D. Roosevelt was the first person to drive through it. The Brooklyn–Battery Tunnel (officially known as the Hugh L. Carey Tunnel) runs underneath Battery Park and connects the Financial District at the southern tip of Manhattan to Red Hook in Brooklyn.

Cycling network 

Cycling in New York City is associated with mixed cycling conditions that include urban density, relatively flat terrain, congested roadways with stop-and-go traffic, and many pedestrians. The city's large cycling population includes utility cyclists, such as delivery and messenger services; cycling clubs for recreational cyclists; and an increasing number of commuters. Cycling is increasingly popular in New York City; in 2017 there were approximately 450,000 daily bike trips, compared with 170,000 daily bike trips in 2005.

People

Global outreach 

In 2006, the Sister City Program of the City of New York, Inc. was restructured and renamed New York City Global Partners. Through this program, New York City has expanded its international outreach to a network of cities worldwide, promoting the exchange of ideas and innovation between their citizenry and policymakers. New York's historic sister cities are denoted below by the year they joined New York City's partnership network.

See also

 Outline of New York City

Notes

References

Further reading

  From Google Books.

External links  

 
 NYC Go, official tourism website
 
 
 Collections, 145,000 NYC photographs at the Museum of the City of New York
 

 
1624 establishments in North America
1624 establishments in the Dutch Empire
1898 establishments in New York (state)
1898 establishments in New York City
Cities in New York (state)
Cities in the New York metropolitan area
Establishments in New Netherland
Former capitals of the United States
Former state capitals in the United States
Populated coastal places in New York (state)
Populated places established by the Dutch West India Company
Populated places established in 1624
Populated places established in 1898
New York (state) populated places on the Hudson River
Port cities and towns of the United States Atlantic coast
Articles with accessibility problems